The Current River forms in the southeastern portion of the Ozarks of Missouri and becomes a 7th order stream as it flows southeasterly out of the Ozarks into northeastern Arkansas where it becomes a tributary of the Black River, which is a tributary of the White River, a tributary of the Mississippi River. The basin drains a rural area that is dominated by karst topography, underlain by dolomite and sandstone bedrock with a small area of igneous rock southeast of Eminence, Missouri. In 1964, over 134 mi (160 km) of the upper course of the river and its tributaries were federally protected as the Ozark National Scenic Riverways, the first national park in America to protect a river system.

Source and tributaries
The Current River begins in Montauk State Park located in the southwestern corner of Dent County in southeastern Missouri. The confluence of Pigeon Creek and Montauk Spring form the headwaters of the river. Montauk Spring makes up most of the consistent flow of the headwaters, providing ideal conditions for trout fishing. After leaving Montauk State Park the river enters the Ozark National Scenic Riverways. The uppermost reaches of the river are swift with numerous riffles broken by deep pools of crystal clear water, further downstream the riffles continue but get further apart. Hardwood trees, rock ledges, caves, springs, gravel bars, and towering dolomite bluffs line the banks of the river. Other notable springs to add to the river include Cave Spring, Pulltite Spring, and Round Spring. Downstream from the headwaters approximately  the Current River receives its largest tributary the Jacks Fork from the west near the small town of Eminence, Missouri. South of Van Buren a few miles the Current River receives its second biggest tributary, the largest spring in the Ozarks and one of the largest single spring outlets known in the world. From Big Spring the river continues southeasterly leaving the Ozark National Scenic Riverways  from the headwaters. The river then flows through Mark Twain National Forest until reaching Doniphan, Missouri and passes under U.S. Route 160. From here the river slows as it exits the Ozark Highlands, the river continues its slow silt laden path into Arkansas where it receives the Little Black River from the northeast before it joins the Black River near Pocahontas, Arkansas.

Recreational activities

Canoeing, fishing, horseback riding, and camping are popular activities along the Current River. The river is fairly gentle and is considered to have mostly class 1 rapids and a few rated class 2.

Some of the points of interest along the course of the river include Montauk State Park, Welch Spring and its abandoned tuberculosis hospital, Aker's Ferry, Cave Spring, Devil's Well, Deer Leap, Rock House Cave, Pulltite Spring, Round Spring, Jacks Fork, Blue Spring, Rocky Falls (on a small tributary), and Big Spring.

See also
List of Missouri rivers
List of Arkansas rivers
List of Ozark springs

References

Further reading
Stars Upstream: Life Along an Ozark River, Leonard Hall, University of Chicago Press, Chicago, 1959 
Missouri Ozark Waterways, Oz Hawksley, Missouri Department of Conservation, P.O. Box 180, Jefferson City, MO 65102, 1965, Revised 1989 Conservation Commission of the State of Missouri

External links

Ozark National Scenic Riverways
Missouri Scenic Rivers
Information compiled by the Missouri Department of Conservation
Discharge of Big Spring, USGS (1981–2006)

Rivers of Arkansas
Rivers of Missouri
Bodies of water of the Ozarks
Tributaries of the Black River (Arkansas–Missouri)
Bodies of water of Clay County, Arkansas
Rivers of Randolph County, Arkansas
Rivers of Carter County, Missouri
Rivers of Dent County, Missouri
Rivers of Ripley County, Missouri
Rivers of Shannon County, Missouri